Floyd Nicholson (born July 26, 1949) is a former Democratic member of the South Carolina Senate, representing the 10th District from 2009 to 2021. He is a retired teacher and former mayor and city council member of Greenwood, South Carolina, where he resides.

References

1949 births
Living people
African-American state legislators in South Carolina
Democratic Party South Carolina state senators
South Carolina State University alumni
People from Greenwood, South Carolina
South Carolina city council members
Mayors of places in South Carolina
21st-century American politicians
21st-century African-American politicians
20th-century African-American people